The Poonch Division is a first-order administrative division of the Pakistani dependent territory of Azad Kashmir. It comprises the portion of the former Poonch District of the princely state of Jammu and Kashmir that came under Pakistani control at the end of the Indo-Pakistani War of 1947.

Administrative Divisions
Currently, the Poonch Division consists of the following districts:

 Bagh District
 Haveli District
 Poonch District
 Sudhanoti District

External links 
 Districts plotted on OpenStreetMap: Sudhanoti, Poonch, Bagh,Haveli. 

Azad Kashmir
Divisions of Pakistan